The 2016 Southern Miss Golden Eagles football team represented the University of Southern Mississippi in the 2016 NCAA Division I FBS football season. The Golden Eagles played their home games at the M. M. Roberts Stadium in Hattiesburg, Mississippi, and competed in the West Division of Conference USA (C–USA). They were led by first-year head coach Jay Hopson. They finished the season 7–6, 4–4 in C-USA play to finish in third place in the West Division. They were invited to the New Orleans Bowl where they defeated Louisiana–Lafayette.

Schedule
Southern Miss announced its 2016 football schedule on February 4, 2016. The 2016 schedule consists of 6 home and away games in the regular season. The Golden Eagles will host C–USA foes Charlotte, Marshall, Louisiana Tech, and Rice, and will travel to North Texas, Old Dominion, UTEP, and UTSA.

The team will play four non–conference games, two home games against Savannah State from the Mid-Eastern Athletic Conference and Troy from the Sun Belt Conference, and two road games against Kentucky and LSU both from the Southeastern Conference (SEC).

Schedule Source:

Game summaries

@ Kentucky

Savannah State

Troy

@ UTEP

Rice

@ UTSA

@ LSU

Marshall

Charlotte

@ Old Dominion

@ North Texas

Louisiana Tech

Louisiana–Lafayette (New Orleans Bowl)

Team players drafted in the NFL

References

Southern Miss
Southern Miss Golden Eagles football seasons
New Orleans Bowl champion seasons
Southern Miss Golden Eagles football